The South African cricket team toured England in the 1998 season to play a five-match Test series against England.

England won the series 2-1 with two matches drawn after being 1-0 behind with only the last two matches to play.

South Africa played a three-match series of One Day Internationals  (LOI) against England in May at the start of the tour and then played a short LOI tri-series against England and Sri Lanka to close the tour in August.

In addition, South Africa played seven first-class matches against Worcestershire, Gloucestershire, Sussex, Durham, Derbyshire, Essex and the British Universities.

Test series summary

First Test

Second Test

Third Test

Fourth Test

Fifth Test

ODI series

1st ODI

2nd ODI

3rd ODI

In the end of tour Emirates Triangular tri-series, South Africa lost to Sri Lanka by 57 runs at Trent Bridge and defeated England by 14 runs at Edgbaston.  The win against England was not enough to qualify them for the final, in which Sri Lanka defeated England by 5 wickets at Lord's.

Squad
The South African team was captained by Hansie Cronje and included Paul Adams, Allan Donald, Shaun Pollock, Lance Klusener, Jacques Kallis, Jonty Rhodes, Mark Boucher, Daryl Cullinan, Gary Kirsten, Gerhardus Liebenberg, Nantie Hayward, Brian McMillan, Makhaya Ntini, Pat Symcox, Adam Bacher, Steve Elworthy and Mike Rindel.

Best performances
Darryl Cullinan with 900 runs at an average of 69.23 and Gary Kirsten with 892 runs at 63.71 were the highest scorers for South Africa in first-class matches on the tour.  Kirsten had the highest individual innings of 210 while Cullinan's top score was 200*.

Allan Donald with 39 wickets at an average of 20.12 and a best analysis of 6-56 was the leading bowler on the tour.  Shaun Pollock was the next best with 24 wickets at 24.75.

Mark Boucher kept wicket in nearly all of the tour matches, taking 43 catches and 1 stumping.

External sources
CricketArchive tour itinerary

References
 Playfair Cricket Annual
 Wisden Cricketers Almanack

1998 in South African sport
1998 in English cricket
1998
International cricket competitions from 1997–98 to 2000